Enteromius trinotatus is a species of ray-finned fish in the genus Enteromius which is only found in the Democratic Republic of the Congo.

References 

 

Enteromius
Taxa named by Henry Weed Fowler
Fish described in 1936
Endemic fauna of the Democratic Republic of the Congo